Martha Chol Luak Kok is a South Sudanese politician. She hails from Akobo County. As of 2009 she was the acting speaker of the Jonglei State Legislative Assembly. She was elected to the Jonglei State Legislative Assembly in 2010 as a National Congress Party women's list candidate.

References

Possibly living people
21st-century South Sudanese women politicians
21st-century South Sudanese politicians
National Congress Party (Sudan) politicians